The teams competing in Group 4 of the 2011 UEFA European Under-21 Championships qualifying competition were Finland, Liechtenstein, Netherlands, Poland and Spain.

Standings

Matches

Goalscorers
As of 7 September, there have been 57 goals scored over 20 matches, for an average of 2.85 goals per match.

1 goal

References
UEFA.com

4
under
under